In molecular biology, the calreticulin protein family is a family of calcium-binding proteins. This family includes Calreticulin, Calnexin and Camlegin.

References

Protein families